The Joint may refer to:

 Slang for prison
 American Jewish Joint Distribution Committee, colloquially known as "The Joint"
 The Joint (Sirius XM) XM radio Reggae channel
 The Joint (music venue) at the Hard Rock Hotel in Las Vegas
 The Joint, band with Rick Davies and Steve Jolliffe, prior to Supertramp
 The Joint Chiropractic, a chiropractic franchise founded in 1999 with headquarters located in Scottsdale, AZ.

See also
 Joint (disambiguation)